In the Cold of the Night is a 1990 American erotic thriller film produced and directed by Nico Mastorakis, and written by Mastorakis and Fred C. Perry. It stars Jeff Lester, Adrianne Sachs, Marc Singer, Brian Thompson, Shannon Tweed, John Beck, Tippi Hedren, and David Soul.

Cast
 Jeff Lester as Scott Bruin
 Adrianne Sachs as Kimberly Shawn
 Marc Singer as Ken Strom
 Brian Thompson as Phil
 Shannon Tweed as Lena
 John Beck as Rudy
 Tippi Hedren as Clara
 David Soul as Dr. Frieberg

Release and reception
According to the book The Naked Truth: Why Hollywood Doesn't Make X-Rated Movies by Kevin S. Sandler, In the Cold of Night was initially assigned an X rating by the Motion Picture Association of America just prior to their adoption of the NC-17 rating.

Brian Orndorf of Blu-ray.com called the film "ridiculous", and wrote that it "isn't nearly as fun as a could be, laboring through an uninteresting story with an uncomfortably dim protagonist." Rob Hunter of Film School Rejects also referred to the film as "ridiculous", and wrote that "it does overstay its welcome, though, as some elements are dragged out too long, but it's a small price to pay for the softcore fun and stellar B-movie cast."

Home media
In March 2019, the film was restored in 4K and released on DVD and Blu-ray by Vinegar Syndrome.

References

External links
 
 

1990s erotic thriller films
American erotic thriller films
Films directed by Nico Mastorakis
1990s English-language films
1990s American films